Luca Cereda (born September 7, 1981) is a Swiss former professional ice hockey forward. He was drafted in the first round, 24th overall, of the 1999 NHL Entry Draft by the Toronto Maple Leafs. During his first training camp with the Leafs, Cereda was diagnosed with a heart murmur due to a defect in his aortic valve. Apart from exhibition games with the Leafs before the diagnosis, he never appeared in a National Hockey League (NHL) game. After his recovery from his heart surgery, he played in the Leafs' minor league team for a few years and returned to Switzerland in 2004 to play in the National League instead. He ended his playing career in 2008 due to heart problems and began coaching. In 2017, Cereda succeeded Gordie Dwyer to become the head coach of HC Ambrì-Piotta.

Career statistics

Regular season and playoffs

International

References

External links

1981 births
HC Ambrì-Piotta players
Living people
National Hockey League first-round draft picks
SC Bern players
St. John's Maple Leafs players
Swiss ice hockey forwards
Toronto Maple Leafs draft picks
People from Bellinzona
Sportspeople from Ticino
Swiss ice hockey coaches
Swiss expatriate ice hockey people
Swiss expatriate sportspeople in Canada
Expatriate ice hockey players in Canada